The Barbados Museum & Historical Society is a private organization but membership is open to both members and non-members who are interested in the numerous collections. Established in 1933 in the old Military Prison at the Saint Ann's historic Garrison, the museum has more than 500,000 artifacts that depict the islands rich history and natural history. Inclusive of some of these artifacts are antique maps of the island and paintings.

Besides visiting the museum to view its artifacts, the museum's grounds can also be rented to hold private events such as parties and weddings.

Notable members include Sir John Saint, who was President of the Society from 1946 to 1959.

In 1993 the BMH&S acquired the Newton Slave Burial Ground site located in Christ Church.

Further reading

References

External links 
 The Barbados Museum & Historical Society

Barbadian culture
Museums established in 1933
Museums in Barbados